Azhagiya Periyavan (born 1968 in Peranambut, Vellore) is the pen name of C.Aravindan, a modern Tamil writer and journalist. He writes about Dalit issues.

Thagappan Kodi (Thagappan's Lineage) is his popular novel.

Bibliography 
 Thagappan Kodi (Thagappan's Lineage, 2001)
 Theettu (Ugly, 1998) 
 Vetkam Ketta Nadu (Shameless Country, 2004)
 Azhagiya Periyavan Kathaigal (2003)
 Nerikatti (Pain, 2004)
 Nee Nigalnda Podu (When You Happened, 2000)
 Arubha Nanju (Invisible Poison, 2005)

References

Further reading 
 Satyanarayana, K & Tharu, Susie (2011) No Alphabet in Sight: New Dalit Writing from South Asia, Dossier 1: Tamil and Malayalam, New Delhi: Penguin Books.

Tamil-language writers
Indian male novelists
Indian male journalists
Living people
1968 births
Dalit writers
Novelists from Tamil Nadu
Journalists from Tamil Nadu